Cop car is a slang term for a police car.

Cop car may also refer to:

 Cop Car (film), a 2015 American film
 "Cop Car" (Keith Urban song), 2014
 "Cop Car", song 1996 by Joey Beltram

See also
Paddywagon
Prisoner transport vehicle